Mercato San Severino is a town and comune of the province of Salerno in the Campania region of south-west Italy. 

Mercato San Severino shares borders with the municipalities of Baronissi, Bracigliano, Castel San Giorgio, Cava de' Tirreni, Fisciano, Montoro, Roccapiemonte and Siano.

Transport
Mercato San Severino is served by two railway stations: Mercato San Severino is located in the middle of the town, on the lines Salerno-Mercato San Severino, Cancello-Benevento via Avellino and Mercato San Severino-Nocera Inferiore. On this second line is located the stop of Valle, in the same-named suburb of Sant'Angelo in Macerata.

It is served by the A30 motorway (Salerno-Caserta) at the same-named exit (located near Curteri), and also by the RA 02 (Salerno-Avellino) at the exit "Fisciano-Mercato San Severino".

Twin towns
 Farébersviller (France)

Personalities
Antonio Somma  (1923-2005), partisan, Director of the CGIL trade union, official in the Italian Communist Party from 1951 to 1989.
Gennaro Maria Sarnelli (1702-1744), redemptorist, blessed.

Notes and references

External links

Cities and towns in Campania